Clear Creek is a stream in the U.S. state of Indiana. It is a tributary of the Eel River.

Clear Creek was named because of the character of its water.

See also
List of rivers of Indiana

References

Rivers of Kosciusko County, Indiana
Rivers of Wabash County, Indiana
Rivers of Indiana